Hangangjin station is a subway station on the Seoul Subway Line 6.

Station layout

Vicinity
Exit 1 : Yongsan International School of Seoul, Grand Hyatt Seoul, Norwegian Embassy of Seoul,
Exit 2 : Bukhannam samgeori (3-way intersection)
Exit 3 : Hannam Foreigners APT

References 

Seoul Metropolitan Subway stations
Metro stations in Yongsan District
Railway stations opened in 2001